Kang Sun-nam is a North Korean and politician and general. He is the director of the Civil Defense Department of the Workers' Party of Korea which oversees the Worker-Peasant Red Guards, a member of the Central Military Commission of the Workers' Party of Korea, and a member of the 8th Central Committee of the Workers' Party of Korea. He has held positions such as Deputy Minister of the People's Armed Forces and Commander of the 671st Grand Combined Unit, Appointed as Minister of Defence during the 6th Enlarged Plenary Meeting of the 8th Central Committee of the Worker's Party of Korea

Biography
His birthplace and date of birth are unknown. He was first elected as a member of the funeral committee for Marshal Lee Ul-sol, who died on November 7, 2015. On December 24 of the same year, he participated in the joint operation training of the Grand Combined Forces as the commander of the 671st Combined Force.
At the 7th Congress of the WPK held on May 9, 2016, he was elected as a member of the Central Committee of the Workers' Party of Korea, and although the timing of his appointment is unknown, he became Vice Minister of People's Armed Forces. On July 25, 2017, he attended the 90th anniversary of the founding of the People's Liberation Army of China at the Chinese Embassy in North Korea and met with Chinese Ambassador Li Jinjun.

He was elected as a delegate in the election of delegates to the 14th Supreme People's Assembly held on March 10, 2019. He was elected as a member of the 8th Central Committee at the 8th Congress of the Workers' Party of Korea held from January 5, 2021, and at the 1st Plenary meeting of the 8th Central Committee of the Party held on January 10, the Workers' Party of Korea He was elected as a member of the 8th Central Military Commission and the Director of the Munition Industry Department of the Central Committee.

On September 9, 2021, at the military parade celebrating the 73rd anniversary of the founding of the country, it was confirmed that he was appointed director of the Civil Defense department of the WPK.

On April 14, 2022, he was promoted to general by order of the Central Military Commission. In August that year he made a report to the 6th meeting of the Workers' Peasants Red Guard.

Awards and honors 
During the February 8 2023 parade, Kang could be seen wearing all decorations awarded to him.

References

North Korean generals
North Korean politicians
Members of the Supreme People's Assembly
8th Central Committee of the Workers' Party of Korea
Year of birth missing (living people)
Living people